Ali Davāni(Persian: علی دوانی) was an Iranian scholar and researcher, working in the fields of anthropology, bibliography and history.

Early life and education
Davāni was born on 27 September 1929 in Davan, a village located at the north of Kazerun. He left his village to Abadan aged six. He went to Holy Najaf when he was 14 and returned to his birthplace after five years of study. He went to Qom to complete his education in 1949 after his marriage. He was subsequently granted the super ordinate rank of Allāmeh Tabātabā'i, Ayatollah Borujerdi and Imam Khomeini in Qom too.

Activities
As well as scholarship, Davāni was involved in establishing the scientific and religious magazine of Maktab-e Islam, and writing Ayatollah Vahid Behbahāni's biography, on the encouragement of Ayatollah Borujerdi. He also translated the 13th Volume of Behār-ul Anvār into Persian about Imam Mahdi.

In 1971, following some disputes that led to his colleagues at Maktab-e Islam magazine leaving Qom, Davāni moved from Qom to Tehran, to continue his mission as an "inheritor of the prophets".

Davāni died on 8 January 2007.

References

 

Iranian scholars
Davani,Ali
1929 births
2007 deaths
Iranian biographers
Iran's Book of the Year Awards recipients
Qom Seminary alumni
Burials at Fatima Masumeh Shrine